The Carmel Clay School District is a public school district located in Carmel, Indiana, serving Carmel and Clay Township. The district operates 11 elementary schools (grades K-5), three middle schools (grades 6–8) and one high school, with an overall enrollment of 16,352 in the 2018–2019 school year. The district superintendent is Michael Beresford and the Board President is Katie Browning.

School

Elementary Schools
 Carmel Elementary School (opened 1961, new building 2021)
 Cherry Tree Elementary School (opened 1989)
 Clay Center Elementary School (opened 2021)
 College Wood Elementary School (opened 1965, relocated 2004)
 Forest Dale Elementary School (opened 1979)
 Mohawk Trails Elementary School (opened 1972)
 Orchard Park Elementary School (opened 1955, closed 2021)
 Prairie Trace Elementary School (opened 1998)
 Smoky Row Elementary School (opened 1992)
 Towne Meadow Elementary School (opened 2000)
 West Clay Elementary School (opened 2006)
 Woodbrook Elementary School (opened 1970)

Middle Schools
 Carmel Middle School (opened as Carmel Junior High School in 1964)
 Clay Middle School (opened as Clay Junior High School in 1974)
 Creekside Middle School (opened 2004)

High School
 Carmel High School

References

External links

 District Website

School districts in Indiana
Education in Hamilton County, Indiana
Carmel, Indiana